The 2000–01 season was the 90th season in Hajduk Split’s history and their tenth in the Prva HNL. Their 2nd place finish in the 1999–2000 season meant it was their 10th successive season playing in the Prva HNL.

Competitions

Overall record

Prva HNL

First stage

Second stage (championship play-off)

Results summary

Results by round

Results by opponent

Source: 2000–01 Croatian First Football League article

Matches

Prva HNL

Source: hajduk.hr

Croatian Football Cup

Source: hajduk.hr

Champions League

Source: hajduk.hr

Player seasonal records

Top scorers

Source: Competitive matches

See also
2000–01 Croatian First Football League
2000–01 Croatian Football Cup

References

External sources
 2000–01 Prva HNL at HRnogomet.com
 2000–01 Croatian Cup at HRnogomet.com
 2000–01 UEFA Champions League at rsssf.com

HNK Hajduk Split seasons
Hajduk Split
Croatian football championship-winning seasons